This is a list of all present sovereign states in South America and their predecessors. The division between North and South America is unclear, generally viewed as lying somewhere in the Isthmus of Panama, however, the whole of Panama is considered to be part of North America as its southernmost nation. The continent was colonized by the Europeans: First by the Spaniards, and the Portuguese; and later by the Dutch, the French, and the English. Most of the present-day nations gained independence in the early 19th century. Today, South America consists of twelve sovereign states with common government system being some form of presidential republic.

See also
List of sovereign states and dependent territories in South America
Succession of states
Decolonization of the Americas

Lists of former countries
Sov
Former countries in South America
History of South America